Daniella Goldfarb is an Israeli chemist who is the Erich Klieger Professorial Chair in Chemical Physics at the Weizmann Institute of Science. She is the President’s Advisor for Advancing Women in Science. Her research makes use of electron paramagnetic resonance spectroscopy. She was awarded the 2016 Israel Chemical Society Excellence prize.

Early life and education 
Goldfarb was born in Paris. She was an undergraduate student at the Hebrew University of Jerusalem, where she majored in chemistry. She moved to the United States for her graduate studies, and earned a Master's degree at the University of Rhode Island in 1978.  After completing her graduate degree, she joined the laboratory of Zeev Luz at the Weizmann Institute of Science. Her doctoral research made use of magnetic resonance imaging to study liquid crystalline phases. She was a postdoctoral scholar at the University of Houston.

Research and career 
In 1987, Goldfarb returned to the Weizmann Institute of Science, where she was made a scientist in the Department of Isotope Research. She was promoted to Professor in 1998. Her research considers electron paramagnetic resonance spectroscopy. She has contributed to our understanding of protein structure and how proteins respond to drugs.

In 2014, Goldfarb was appointed the Weizmann Institute of Science President’s Advisor for Advancing Women in Science.

Awards and honours 
 2007 Royal Society of Chemistry Bruker Prize
 2009 International Zavoisky Award
 2011 Technion – Israel Institute of Technology Kolthoff Prize
 2013 Elected Fellow of the Royal Society of Chemistry
 2015 Elected President of the International Society of Magnetic Resonance
 2016 Israel Chemical Society Excellence prize
 2017 International EPR Society Silver Medal
 2019 Ernst Prize 
 2020 Elected Fellow of the International EPR Society

Selected publications

Books

Personal life 
Goldfarb is married with two daughters.

References 

Living people
Year of birth missing (living people)
Academic staff of Weizmann Institute of Science
Hebrew University of Jerusalem alumni
University of Rhode Island faculty
French emigrants to Israel
Israeli chemists